Tomoplagia deflorata is a species of tephritid or fruit flies in the genus Tomoplagia of the family Tephritidae.

Distribution
Guatemala, Costa Rica, Panama.

References

Tephritinae
Insects described in 1937
Diptera of South America